Parambassis wolffii, commonly known as the duskyfin glassy perchlet, is a species of freshwater fish in the Asiatic glassfish family Ambassidae of order Perciformes. It is native to Thailand and Indonesia. The specific name honours Bleeker's friend, the military surgeon Wolff.

References

wolffii
Fish of Indonesia
Fish of Thailand
Fish described in 1850